"Katyusha" (  – a diminutive form of , Yekaterina — Katherine), also transliterated as "Katjuša", "Katioucha", or "Katiusza", is a Russian of Soviet era folk-based song and military march composed by Matvey Blanter in 1938, with lyrics written by the Soviet poet Mikhail Isakovsky. It gained fame during World War II as a patriotic song, inspiring the population to serve and defend their land in the war effort. The song was still popular in Russia in 1995. The song is the source of the nickname of the BM-8, BM-13, and BM-31 "Katyusha" rocket launchers that were used by the Red Army in World War II.

Song
The song is about a Russian woman called Katyusha. Standing on a steep riverbank, she sings a song to her beloved, a soldier serving far away. The theme of the song is that the soldier will protect the Motherland and its people while his grateful girl will keep and protect their love. Its lyrics became relevant during the Second World War, when many Soviet men left their wives and girlfriends to serve in the Soviet Army during World War II, known in Russia as The Great Patriotic War.

Performance history

The song's popularity began to increase with the beginning of Operation Barbarossa launched by Germany against the Soviet Union. The song was sung by female students from a Soviet industrial school in Moscow, bidding farewell to soldiers going to the battle front against Nazi Germany. Its first official performance was by Valentina Batishcheva in the Column Hall of Moscow's House of the Unions, at the State Jazz Orchestra concert in the Autumn of 1938. It has since been performed many times by other famous singers, including Lidia Ruslanova, Tamara Sinyavskaya, Georgi Vinogradov, Eduard Khil, Anna German, Ivan Rebroff, Dmitri Hvorostovsky, Joseph Kobzon and more. "Katyusha" is part of the repertoire of the Alexandrov Ensemble.

In other languages
In 1943, the Kingdom of Italy, until then one of the Axis powers, joined the Allies. During the next two years, Italian partisans fought against German forces in Italy and Italian Fascists.  wrote Italian lyrics for "Katyusha". His adaptation, Fischia il vento (The Wind Blows), became one of the most famous partisan anthems, along with Bella ciao and La Brigata Garibaldi.

During the last battles on the Eastern Front, the Blue Division used the melody of "Katyusha" for an adaptation called Primavera (Spring), a chant extolling the value of Spanish fascist fighters.

During the Greek Civil War (1946–1949), Greek partisans who fought against the German invasion in 1941 wrote their version of "Katyusha" named Ο ύμνος του ΕΑΜ (The Hymn of EAM). The text to the melody was written by Vassilis Rotas, recorded much later by Thanos Mikroutsikos and sung by Maria Dimitriadi.

It has also been performed by the Syrian Communist Party in Arabic.

The song was translated into Hebrew and performed by 1945, and has been popular ever since in Israel.

Katyusha is also a popular song sung in the People's Republic of China due to influence from the Soviet Union in the second half of the 20th century and is still widely popular. The popularity of these songs even reached a point in China that at the time young people would deem it a great shame if they couldn't sing them. During the 2015 Moscow Victory Day Parade, the Chinese honor guard contingent led by Li Bentao surprised hundreds of locals when they sang Katyusha during their march back to their living quarters during a nighttime rehearsal. That same parade saw the song being performed by the Massed Bands of the Moscow Garrison during the march past of foreign contingents (specifically that of India, Mongolia, Serbia and China).

In Indonesia, the Joko Widodo campaign song Goyang Jempol Jokowi Gaspol uses its melody.

It is a popular song in Iceland (particularly among schoolchildren) where it is known as "" ("Be Ready When Spring Calls"), the lyrics by Tryggvi Þorsteinsson encourage hard work in the hayfields in spring.

A French-language version, titled "Casatchok", was released by Israeli singer Rika Zaraï in 1969.

In Finland the best known version (in Finnish) of the song is called "Sörkan sällit", which is also quite popular as a student party song.

In popular culture 
Katyusha has appeared in numerous works, most often in tandem with Russian or Soviet topics, including a level featuring the USSR in the 1989 NES video game Super Dodgeball, and in the 2013 album The Circus At The End Of The World by the band Abney Park.

A variant of the song appeared in the 2018 film Cold War.

See also

 Role of music in World War II
 War song

References

External links
Valeria Kurnushkina & Red Army Choir performing Katyusha song

Катюша / Katyusha — Lyrics and MP3 song, at the Marxists Internet Archive
Article about the song 

1938 songs
Lidia Ruslanova songs
Russian military marches
Russian-language songs
Songs about soldiers
Songs about the military
Songs of World War II
Soviet songs